Cheshmeh-ye Mostafa Beyg (also Romanized as Cheshmeh-ye Moşţafá Beyg; also known as Cheshmeh-ye Moşţafá Beg) is a village in Dasht-e Hor Rural District, in the Central District of Salas-e Babajani County, Kermanshah Province, Iran. At the 2006 census, its population was 160, in 32 families.

References 

Populated places in Salas-e Babajani County